1975 Emperor's Cup Final was the 55th final of the Emperor's Cup competition. The final was played at National Stadium in Tokyo on January 1, 1976. Hitachi won the championship.

Overview
Hitachi won their 2nd title, by defeating Fujita Industries 2–0. Hitachi was featured a squad consisting of Tatsuhiko Seta, Yoshitada Yamaguchi, Masaki Yokotani, Nobuo Kawakami, Kazuhisa Kono, Minoru Kobata, Akira Matsunaga and Shusaku Hirasawa.

Match details

See also
1975 Emperor's Cup

References

Emperor's Cup
1975 in Japanese football
Kashiwa Reysol matches
Shonan Bellmare matches